Lánycsók is a village in Baranya County, Hungary.

Until the end of World War II, the majority of the inhabitants were Danube Swabians, also called locally as Stifolder, because their ancestors once came at the 17th century and 18th century from Fulda (district). Most of the former German settlers were expelled to Allied-occupied Germany and Allied-occupied Austria in 1945-1948, about the Potsdam Agreement.
Only few Germans of Hungary live there today, the majority are the descendants of Hungarians from the Czechoslovak–Hungarian population exchange, who got the houses of the former Danube Swabians inhabitants.

References

Populated places in Baranya County